Nina Koivumäki (born July 23, 1985 in Pori) is a Finnish judoka, who played for the lightweight category. She is a five-time national champion, and a three-time medalist at the European Junior Championships. She is a member of Tampereen Judo Club in Tampere, and is coached and trained by Tapio Mantymaki.

Koivumaki qualified for the women's half-lightweight class (57 kg) at the 2008 Summer Olympics in Beijing, by placing fifth from the 2007 World Judo Championships in Rio de Janeiro, Brazil. She reached only into the second preliminary round, where she lost by two yukos to China's Xu Yan. Because her opponent advanced further into the semi-finals, Koivumaki offered another shot for the bronze medal by defeating Algeria's Lila Latrous, with a koka and a golden score, in the first repechage bout. Unfortunately, she finished only in ninth place, after losing out the second repechage bout to Japan's Aiko Sato, who successfully scored an ippon and a yoko shiho gatame (seven mat holds), in three minutes.

References

External links
 
 Profile – Suomen Olympiakomitea
 NBC 2008 Olympics profile

Finnish female judoka
Living people
Olympic judoka of Finland
Judoka at the 2008 Summer Olympics
Sportspeople from Pori
1985 births